Carex virescens, the ribbed sedge, is a species of flowering plant in the family Cyperaceae, native to eastern North America.
 It strongly resembles and has nearly the same range as Carex swanii.

References

virescens
Flora of Quebec
Flora of Ontario
Flora of Illinois
Flora of Missouri
Flora of the Northeastern United States
Flora of the Southeastern United States
Plants described in 1805